Route 21A, or Highway 21A, may refer to:

India
  National Highway 21A (India)

United States
 County Road 21A (Clay County, Florida)
 M-21A (Michigan highway) (former)
 Nebraska Spur 21A
 New Jersey Route 21A (former)
 New York State Route 21A (former)
 County Route 21A (Suffolk County, New York)
 County Route 21A (Sullivan County, New York)
 County Route 21A (Warren County, New York)
 Secondary State Highway 21A (Washington) (former)

See also
 List of A21 roads